Vladimir Vukoje (born 21 July 1952 in Sečanj) is a former Serbiann handball player and handball coach.

Honours
Kvarner
Yugoslav Second League
Winner (1): 1974-75

Celje
Yugoslav Cup
Finalist (2): 1978, 1980
Yugoslav First B/Second League
Winner (3): 1979-80, 1980-81, 1982-83

Zamet
Yugoslav Second League
Runner-up (1): 1983-84

Bayer Dormagen
2. Bundesliga
Winner (1): 1986-87
Runner-up (1): 1985-86

Düsseldorf
2. Bundesliga
Promotion (1): 1990-91

Individual
Reinickendorfer Füchse top goalscorer - 1984-85 season - 155 goals

References

Croatian male handball players
RK Zamet players
RK Zamet coaches
People from Sečanj
Handball players from Rijeka
RK Kvarner players
Yugoslav emigrants to Germany
1952 births
Living people